John Linn (December 3, 1763 – January 5, 1821) was a U.S. Representative from New Jersey from 1817 to 1821.

Born near Johnsonburg, Hardwick Township, New Jersey, Linn moved with his father to Sussex County, New Jersey.
He attended the common schools.
He served in the Continental Army as a private in the First Regiment, Captain Mannings's company.
He was promoted to sergeant.
He served as member of the New Jersey General Assembly 1801–1804.
He served as judge of the court of common pleas 1805–1821 and the Sheriff of Sussex County in 1812.

Linn was elected as a Republican to the Fifteenth and Sixteenth Congresses and served from March 4, 1817, until his death in Washington, D.C. on January 5, 1821.
He was interred in North Hardyston Cemetery in Hardyston Township, New Jersey.

See also
List of United States Congress members who died in office (1790–1899)

References

1763 births
1821 deaths
Republican Party members of the New Jersey General Assembly
People from Hardwick Township, New Jersey
Politicians from Sussex County, New Jersey
New Jersey Democratic-Republicans
Continental Army soldiers
Republican Party members of the United States House of Representatives from New Jersey